A walkstation is an electronic music device which provides musicians with the facilities of a music workstation in a portable package.
The term was introduced as part of the marketing for the Yamaha QY10, presumably as a portmanteau of Walkman and workstation.
Its usage is typically limited to the portable members of Yamaha's QY sequencer family.

The features of a walkstation are:
 sound module
 music sequencer 
 (usually) a small musical keyboard.
 small size
 battery power

The heyday of the walkstation lay between the time when creating such devices was viable and the time when general-purpose portable devices, such as laptops and mobile phones, were capable of offering comparable functionality.

Devices

Other comparable devices:

More recent portable music workstations:
Teenage Engineering OP-1
Cyberstep KDJ-ONE

References

Music workstations
Electronic musical instruments
Music sequencers
Sound production technology